is a Japanese comedian who performs tsukkomi in the comedy duo Speed Wagon. His partner is Kazuhiro Ozawa.

Itoda is represented with Horipro Com. His father is former City Council Vice Chairman from Komaki, Aichi Prefecture Tomitaka Itoda. Itoda graduated from Aichi Prefecture Komaki Industrial High School. His ex-wife is Yumi Adachi.

Filmography

Entertainment shows
 Current regular programmes

 Former regular programmes

 Former quasi-regular programmes

 Other appearances

One-off, specials

Dramas

Internet dramas

Films

Stage

Direct-to-video

Television advertisements

Music videos

References

External links
 

Japanese comedians
Japanese male actors
Horipro artists
People from Aichi Prefecture
1972 births
Living people